Jean Desailly (24 August 1920 – 11 June 2008) was a French actor. He was a member of the Comédie-Française from 1942 to 1946, and later participated in about 90 movies.

Life and career
Desailly studied at the École nationale supérieure des beaux-arts and the Conservatoire de Paris winning first prize, joining the Comédie-Française in 1942. In 1946 he became a leading member of the Jean-Louis Barrault-Madeleine Renaud company at the Théâtre Marigny, playing in a wide repertoire from Les Fausses Confidences, Bérénice and Le Songe d'une nuit d'été.

With the Renaud-Barrault at the Odéon-Théâtre de France he played both leading roles in le Mariage de Figaro: Figaro on tour in the provinces and Count Almaviva in Paris.

Desailly's second wife was the French actress Simone Valère, with whom he formed a theatre company which they directed successively at the Théâtre Hébertot and the Théâtre de la Madeleine. A wide repertoire was played at the two theatres from 1972 to 2002.

In music he was the narrator on the 1965 recording of Stravinsky's Oedipus rex conducted by Karel Ančerl for Supraphon and on the 1971 recording of Honegger's Le roi David under Charles Dutoit for Erato (with Valère as the prophetess).

Partial filmography

1943: Strange Inheritance - Gilles Mauvoisin
1945: Father Goriot - Bianchon
1945: The Last Judgment - Kyril
1946: Sylvie and the Ghost - Frédéric
1946: Pastoral Symphony - Jacques Martens - son fils
1946: Patrie (directed by Louis Daquin) - Karloo
1946: The Revenge of Roger - Raymond de Noirville
1947: Amours, délices et orgues - Jean Pelletier dit 'Pivoine'
1947: Carré de valets - Jacques de la Bastide
1948: Une grande fille toute simple - Michel
1949: L'échafaud peut attendre - Michel Vincent
1949: The Mark of the Day - Larzac
1949: La veuve et l'innocent - Claude Girelle
1949: Keep an Eye on Amelia (Occupe-toi d'Amélie) - Marcel Courbois
1950: Chéri - Fred Peloux, dit 'Chéri'
1950: Véronique - Florestan
1951: Demain nous divorçons - Max Blachet
1952: Jocelyn - Jocelyn
1954: Royal Affairs in Versailles - Marivaux
1955: Les Grandes manoeuvres (directed by René Clair) - Victor Duverger
1955: On ne badine pas avec l'amour - Perdican
1958: Maigret tend un piège - Marcel Maurin
1958: Les Grandes Familles (directed by Denys de La Patellière) - François Schoudler
1959: A Midsummer Night's Dream (Sen noci svatojánské) (animation directed by Jiří Trnka) - Narrator (French version) (voice)
1959: 125, rue Montmartre - Commissaire Dodelot
1959: Le secret du Chevalier d'Éon - Louis XV
1960: Préméditation - Le juge Lenoir
1960: The Baron of the Locks - Maurice Montbernon
1960: Le Saint mène la danse - Fred Pellmann
1960: Love and the Frenchwoman - Voice of the speaker (segment "Adolescence, L'")
1961: Un soir sur la plage - Dr. Francis
1961: La Mort de Belle (directed by Édouard Molinaro) - Stéphane Blanchon
1961: Legge di guerra - Rade
1961: Famous Love Affairs - Le baron de Jonchère (segment "Comédiennes, Les")
1962: The Seven Deadly Sins - Monsieur Duparc - le père de Bernard (segment "Luxure, La")
1962: Le Doulos (directed by Jean-Pierre Melville) - Le commissaire Clain
1964: Graduation Year - M. Terrenoire
1964: The Soft Skin (La Peau douce) (directed by François Truffaut) (nominated for the Golden Palm at the Cannes Film Festival in 1964; received the Bodil Award for Best European Film in 1965) - Pierre Lachenay
1965: The Two Orphans - Le comte de Linières
1966: De Dans van de Reiger - Edouard
1967: The 25th Hour - Cabinet Minister
1967: Le Franciscain de Bourges - Monsieur Toledano
1967: La Vie parisienne (directed by Yves-André Hubert) (television version of 1958 stage production by Jean-Louis Barrault) - Raoul de Gardefeu
1970: L'ardoise - Le commissaire Clair
1971: Comptes à rebours - Michel St Rose
1972: The Assassination of Trotsky - Alfred Rosmer
1972: Un flic - L'homme distingué
1972-1973: Les Rois maudits (TV Mini-Series) - Récitant / Narrator
1973: The Inheritor - Jean-Pierre Carnavan
1973: Night Flight from Moscow - Narrator (voice, uncredited)
1974:  - M. Desvrières
1979: Le cavaleur - Charles-Edmond
1979: Jeu de la barbichette - Le directeur de la Police Judiciaire
1979: Le mouton noir - De Brugères
1980: Pile ou face - Bourgon-Massenet
1981: Le Professionnel (won the Golden Screen Award, 1983) - Le ministre
1984: Le fou du roi - Louis XIV
1990: Équipe de nuit - Le père
1990: Le Radeau de la Méduse - Tullaye
1999: La dilettante - Edmond Thibault
2000: En face - (voice) (final film role)

Awards and nominations
1960: Nominated for the BAFTA Award for Best Actor in a Leading Role in 1960, for his role in Maigret tend un piège.
2002: Awarded the Molière acting prize.

References

External links

1920 births
2008 deaths
Male actors from Paris
Troupe of the Comédie-Française
French male stage actors
French male film actors
French male television actors
20th-century French male actors